In robotics, the manipulability ellipsoid is the geometric interpretation of the scaled eigenvectors resulting from the singular value decomposition of the jacobian that describes a robot's motion.

Robot control
Geometry